The economy of the State of Texas is the second largest by GDP in the United States after that of California. It has a gross state product of $2.4 trillion as of 2022. In 2022, Texas led the nation with the most companies in the Fortune 500 with 53 in total. As of 2021, Texas grossed more than $300 billion a year in exports—more than the exports of California ($175 billion) and New York ($100 billion) combined.

Texas is ranked as the 9th largest economy among nations of the world by GDP, ahead of Canada, South Korea, Russia, and Australia. 

In 2019, Texas had a median household income of $61,874. As of August 31, 2022 Texas had a total of $64.40 billion in state debt outstanding, including both general obligation and revenue debt. Texas has the second largest population in the country after California.

History

Historically four major business enterprises shaped the Texas economy prior to World War II: cattle and bison, cotton, timber, and oil. The first enterprise to enjoy major success in Texas was cattle and bison. In the early days of Anglo-American settlement furs and hides were the major products derived from cattle. Beef was not particularly popular in the United States. However soon Texas entrepreneurs pioneered the beef industry and demand steadily increased. The cattle industry enjoyed its greatest financial success in the later 1870s and 1880s.

Cotton production, which had been known in Texas since Spanish times, gradually increased throughout the 19th century. By the early 20th century Texas had become the leading cotton producer in the nation. By the 1920s the cotton industry was past its peak as government regulation and foreign competition took their toll.

The forests of Texas have been an important resource since its earliest days and have played an important role in the state's history. The vast woodlands of the region, home to many varieties of wildlife when Europeans first arrived, provided major economic opportunities for early settlers. They today continue to play an important role economically and environmentally in the state.

The densest forest lands lie in the eastern part of the state. In particular the Big Thicket region, just north of Houston and Beaumont, has historically been home to the most dense woodlands. The Big Thicket was mostly uninhabited until heavy settlement from the U.S. began in the mid-19th century, and was even used as a refuge by runaway slaves and other fugitives. The Rio Grande valley in South Texas was home to a large palm tree forest when Spaniards first arrived, though today very little of it remains.

The development of railroads in the eastern part of the state during the mid-19th century led to a boom in lumber production in the 1880s. This era of financial success lasted approximately 50 years finally coming to an end as Texas's forests were decimated and the Great Depression dropped prices.

In 1901 the Gladys City Oil, Gas, and Manufacturing Company struck oil on Spindletop Hill in Beaumont. Though petroleum production was not new, this strike was by far the largest the world had ever seen. The find led to widespread exploration throughout Texas and neighboring states. By 1940 Texas was firmly established as the leading oil producer in the U.S.

Texas remained largely rural until World War II though the success of the petroleum industry rapidly expanded the economy with heavy industry of many types taking root. The second world war created tremendous demand for petroleum and a variety of products that Texas was in a unique position to provide. By the end of the war Texas was one of the leading industrial states and the population had become predominantly urban. Additionally the economy had diversified sufficiently that, though petroleum was still the largest sector by the end of the war, the business community in the state was truly diverse.

The Texas economy today relies largely on information technology, oil and natural gas, aerospace, defense, biomedical research, fuel processing, electric power, agriculture, and manufacturing.

Exports

In 2014, for the thirteenth year in a row, Texas led the United States in export revenues. Texas exports for 2008 totaled $192.2 billion. In 2002, the Port of Houston was 6th among the top sea ports in the world in terms of total cargo volume; Air Cargo World rated Dallas/Fort Worth International Airport as "the best air cargo airport in the world".  The ship channel at the Port of Houston—the largest in the U.S. in international commerce and the  sixth-largest port in the world.

Taxes
According to the Tax Foundation, Texans' state and local tax burdens are among the lowest in the nation, 7th lowest nationally, with state and local taxes costing $3,580 per capita, or 8.7% of resident incomes. Texas is one of only 7 states not to have a state income tax. The state sales tax rate, 6.25%, is above the national medium, with localities adding up to 2% (8.25% total).  Texas does have a "back to school" sales tax holiday once a year (generally around the first weekend in August) on clothing and footwear under $100.

As for Texas's business tax climate, the state ranks 8th in the nation. Property taxes are exclusively collected at the local level in the state, and are generally at rates above the national average. As a whole, Texas is a "tax donor state" with Texans receiving back approximately $0.94 per every dollar of federal income taxes collected in 2005.

Tax burden

Texas is one of the seven states of the United States with no personal state income tax. In addition, Texas does not allow any lower level of government (counties, cities, etc.) to impose an income tax. This means that, for the residents of Texas, the maximum rate of income taxation is the top rate set by the US Government.  Businesses, except for sole proprietorships and partnerships, are subject to a gross margins tax.

The state sales tax is set at 6.25 percent. Cities are allowed to impose an additional 1% tax, and additional taxes not to exceed 1% may be approved by voters for any combination of county sales tax, transportation districts, economic development, and/or crime prevention.  The average sales tax in Texas amounts to 8.25 percent. The state determines the items subject to sales tax, which all other entities must follow.  Motor vehicle sales are subject only to the 6.25% state sales tax.  Food, except for prepared food, and non-prescription medicines are among the major items exempt from sales tax.

While property taxes are among the highest in the nation, property costs are also among the lowest in the nation. Property taxes constitute the majority of revenue and are collected and kept by local governments, as the Texas Constitution specifically prohibits a state property tax.  For real property, counties, cities, and school districts (along with other special districts, such as for a community college or public hospital) can also impose taxes.  All property is assessed uniformly throughout the county via the county "appraisal district", and taxes are assessed based on 100% of the property's assessed value.  While larger personal property items such as cars, boats, and airplanes can be subject to local taxes as well, it is far less common.

Industries

Agriculture

The state has the most farms of all United States both in terms of number and acreage. Texas leads the nation in number of cattle, usually exceeding 16 million head.

Cultivation of mung bean here began during World War II when a Chinese native by the name of Henry Huie – who worked as a U.S. Army cook – planted the staple crop in the clay plains near Vernon.

The state leads nationally in production of sheep and goat products. Texas is king of cotton, leading the nation in cotton production, its leading crop and second-most-valuable farm product. Texas is a leader in cereal crop production. Three counties in the state—Colorado, Wharton and Matagorda—take advantage of water from the Lower Colorado River Authority to grow rice and are responsible for about 5% of annual U.S. rice production.  Texas is also a large producer of watermelons, grapefruits, and cantaloupes.

The Rio Grande valley is one of the best areas for the cultivation of grapefruit. Early varieties like the Duncan had many seeds and pale flesh, but in the 1880s citrus growers in Texas and Florida discovered pink-fleshed seedless grapefruit mutations like the Ruby Red, which along with red-fleshed varieties like the Rio Red and Star Ruby are preferred varieties for modern commercial production. Phomopsis stem-end rot is a common problem in grapefruit here. Burger & Davis 1982 find etaconazole and imazalil are effective against the post-harvest effects if Phomopsis has already occurred pre-harvest in Texas groves.

Fire ants (Solenopsis invicta) are an invasive agricultural pest here.

Grapes are a common crop in some parts of the state. Pierce's Disease is a common problem in the East and South. From 1970-1996 PD was unknown outside of the southern part of the state and this was thought to be impossible, however in that year suddenly many vineyards were heavily hit in north central Texas and some were wiped out completely. PD resistance is important here due to PD's prevalence. Some areas suffer from Cotton root rot of many crops, including grape. It is so associated with this state that it is also called Texas root rot.

In the 1990s strawberry acres had greatly increased especially around Poteet, however by 2004 imported strawberries had competed almost all strawberry production out of the state.

Texas and Arkansas are among the higher producers of spinach in North America and form the eastern limit of large scale commercial production. Major spinach pests here include Myzus persicae (Sulzer), Pegomya spp., and Circulifer tenellus (Baker).

On the other hand this state is the westernmost limit of commercial okra production. Pests include the red imported fire ant (Solenopsis invicta Buren), the southern green stink bug (Nezara viridula (Linnaeus)), and leaffooted bugs (various Leptoglossus spp.).

This state is also one of the largest producers of onions. Production here suffers from onion thrips (Thrips tabaci Lindeman) and onion maggots (Delia antiqua (Meigen)).

Texas is one of the major growers of watermelons. Whiteflies and aphids commonly vector Cucurbit viruses here. Texas A&M AgriLife Extension provides commercial production guides for both seeded and seedless. For seeded varieties they recommend Allsweet, Black Diamond, Bush Sugar Baby, Calhoun Grey, Charleston Gray, Crimson Sweet, Crimson Tide, Dixielee, Golden Crown, Jubilee, Mickylee, Minilee, Mirage, OrangeGlo, Prince Charles, Royal Jubilee, Tendersweet, and Yellow Doll; while for seedless varieties, Gem Dandy, Matrix, Summersweet 5244, Tiffany, and Tri-X 313. In both, common diseases are Alternaria, Downy Mildew, Fusarium Wilt, Gummy Stem Blight, Nematodes, Powdery Mildew, and various viruses. Common insect pests are Aphids, Armyworm (beet armyworm and fall armyworm), Cabbage Looper, Cutworm, various Leafminers, various Mites, Thrips, Webworm, and various Whiteflies. AgriLife also makes recommendations for fungicide, insecticide, and herbicide control of all these in this crop, and for common weeds.

AgriLife provides many other commercial grower guides: Asparagus, Green/Snap Bean, Pinto Bean, Table Beet, Broccoli, Cabbage, Cantaloupe/Muskmelon, Carrot, Cauliflower, Celery, Chinese Cabbage, Cilantro, Collards/Kale, Pickling Cucumber, Slicing Cucumber, Eggplant, Garlic, Honeydew, Melon, Kohlrabi, Leeks, Lettuce, Mustard Greens, Okra, Onion, Parsley, Bell Pepper, Jalapeno Pepper, Potato, Pumpkin, Radish, Southern Pea/Cowpea, Spinach, Squash, Sweet Corn, Sweetpotato, Swiss Chard, Tomato, and Turnip.

Although the Asian cockroach (Blattella asahinai Mizukubo) is a widespread invasive species here it inflicts only minor damage on horticulturals. It also serves as an egg predator of more pestiferous insects, including corn earworm (Helicoverpa zea (Boddie)) and beet armyworm (Spodoptera exigua (Hübner)). In southern counties the roach is one of the most numerous egg predators, in row crops at ~. The Surinam cockroach (Pycnoscelus surinamensis) is not proven to be a major pest but data is lacking. It should not be confused with the Indian cockroach (P. indica) which does not occur here.

Flea beetles, specifically the redheaded (Systena frontalis (Fabricius)) and Smartweed (S. hudsonias) are common in the east but rarely found to the west of there. They are voracious, polyphagous herbivores of both crops and weeds. Due to their affinity for weeds as well, crop protection must include weed management. The Southern tobacco flea beetle (Epitrix fasciata Blatchley) is found along the Gulf Coast.

Aeronautics

Lyndon B. Johnson Space Center, the center of the National Aeronautics and Space Administration (NASA), is located in Houston. It is a leading hub for the Aeronautics industry. The National Space and Biomedical Research Institute is headquartered in Houston.

Dallas/Fort Worth International Airport, located nearly equidistant from downtown Dallas and downtown Fort Worth, is the largest airport in the state, the second-largest in the US, and the fourth-largest in the world. In terms of traffic, DFW is the busiest in the state, the third-busiest in the nation, and the sixth-busiest in the world.  The airport serves 135 domestic destinations and 40 international. DFW is the largest and main hub for American Airlines, one of the world's largest in terms of total passengers-miles transported and passenger fleet size.

Texas's second-largest air facility is Houston's George Bush Intercontinental Airport (IAH), the largest hub of United Airlines. IAH offers service to the most Mexican destinations of any U.S. airport. IAH is currently ranked second among all U.S. airports with scheduled non-stop domestic and international service.

Headquartered in Fort Worth, American Airlines is the world's largest airline by passenger miles, passengers carried, and revenue. Southwest Airlines, also a leader in the commercial passenger market, is based near Love Field airport in Dallas. Lockheed Martin Aeronautics, the aviation division of Lockheed Martin, is also headquartered in Fort Worth, and the company's Missiles and Fire Control division is based in nearby Grand Prairie, along with the American division of Airbus Helicopters, Airbus Helicopters, Inc. Bell Helicopter is headquartered in Fort Worth as well.

Defense
Texas is home to two of the United States Army's largest facilities (in terms of geographic size), Fort Hood in Central Texas near Killeen and Fort Bliss near El Paso.  In addition, Fort Sam Houston in San Antonio is home to the Brooke Army Medical Center, one of the Army's major hospitals and its only burn facility, and the Corpus Christi Army Depot in Corpus Christi, Texas is home to the world's largest helicopter repair and maintenance facility.

The United States Air Force operates several bases in the state – Sheppard (Wichita Falls), Dyess (Abilene), Goodfellow (San Angelo), Laughlin (Del Rio), and Lackland and Randolph (San Antonio) Ellington Airport, (Houston).

The United States Navy operates Naval Air Station Joint Reserve Base Fort Worth (the former Carswell Air Force Base facility) as well as NAS Corpus Christi and NAS Kingsville.

Defense contracting
Texas (specifically Dallas and Houston) has a large number of defense contractors which creates sizable employment for the state.

Two divisions of Lockheed Martin have their divisional headquarters in the DFW area –
Lockheed Martin Aeronautics in Fort Worth (where the F-16 Fighting Falcon, the largest Western fighter program, is manufactured, as well as its successor, the F-35 Lightning II and the F-22 Raptor) and Lockheed Martin Missiles and Fire Control in Grand Prairie.

Fort Worth is also the home of Bell Helicopter Textron, which manufactures several helicopters for the military, including the V-22 and the H-1, on which final assembly is performed in Amarillo. Furthermore, three major defense service contractors (DynCorp, AECOM, and DXC Technology) have substantial operations in Fort Worth.

Other major defense contractors with DFW presence include Boeing (Richardson), Rockwell Collins (Richardson), Vought Corporation (headquarters in Dallas; facilities in Dallas and Grand Prairie), Raytheon (plants in Garland, Dallas, and McKinney), L-3 Communications (plants in Arlington, Carrollton, and Greenville; also has a facility in Waco), BAE Systems (facility in Fort Worth), Leonardo DRS (Dallas), Hewlett Packard Enterprise and NTT Data (Plano), Alliant Techsystems (facility in Fort Worth), and Elbit Systems (facility and US headquarters in Fort Worth). The Defense Contract Audit Agency maintains its Central Region office in Irving.

Outside the DFW area, KBR (the former Halliburton subsidiary) maintains its headquarters in Houston, while the Southwest Research Institute is located in San Antonio. BAE Systems also manufactures the Family of Medium Tactical Vehicles at its facility in Sealy, Texas.

Computer technology

Texas is one of the major hubs in the U.S. for development of computer components, systems, software and information infrastructure. Austin, Dallas, and Houston are the major centers for this industry in Texas. The Austin area is often nicknamed "Silicon Hills" because of the concentration of semiconductor design companies including AMD, Cirrus Logic, Freescale Semiconductor, Intel and Silicon Labs. Dell's headquarters is located in the city's suburb, Round Rock, and major offices for Google, Facebook, EA Games, and Apple are also open in the Austin area. Austin is also the home of the Texas Advanced Computing Center at The University of Texas at Austin. Dallas is the birthplace of the integrated circuit.

The North Dallas area is called the "Telecom Corridor" or the "Silicon Prairie" for the area's high concentration of information technology companies such as Texas Instruments, Perot Systems, and EDS, as well as telecommunications giant AT&T.  San Antonio is the home of cloud computing giant Rackspace, as well as computing pioneer Datapoint.  Harris County-based Compaq, was once one of the world's largest computer companies. After Compaq's merger with Hewlett-Packard, the new owner currently employs more employees in the Houston area than anywhere else in the world.

Energy

Energy is a major component of the state economy. Texans consume the most energy in the nation both in per capita and as a whole. The state is also the nation's largest energy producer, producing twice as much energy as Florida, the state with the second-highest production. It is also the national leader in wind power generation, comprising about 28% of national wind powered electrical production in 2019. Wind power surpassed nuclear power production in the state in 2014.

Tourism

Texas has a large tourism industry. The state tourism slogan is "Texas: It's like a whole other country." Tourists might enjoy San Antonio and El Paso's Hispanic culture, or Fort Worth western attractions. Galveston, Corpus Christi,  and Padre Island are some of the popular Texas resort areas located on the Gulf of Mexico. Houston is Texas's leading convention city along with its Southern culture. Dallas is also one of the nation's leading convention cities as well as San Antonio. Professional and college sports are dominant in both Dallas and Houston.

Entertainment
Texas is a top filmmaking state. Austin is now one of the leading filmmaking locations in the country. The exteriors for the popular soap opera Dallas were filmed on Southfork Ranch, a location near Plano, Texas. From 1995 to 2004, more than $2.75 billion was spent in Texas for film and television production.

The Texas Film Commission was founded for free services to filmmakers, from location research to traveling. Also many Hollywood studios are relocating parts of their production divisions to the Austin, Houston, and Dallas areas.

The media conglomerate iHeartMedia is based in San Antonio, Texas. Video game developers Robot Entertainment, Gearbox Software, and 3D Realms are based in the Dallas Fort Worth area, while Retro Studios, Armature Studio, and Ghostfire Games are based in Austin. Cinemark Theatres which is one of the largest movie theater chains is also based in the Dallas Fort Worth area.

Healthcare

Healthcare is a growing industry in the state of Texas. The Texas Medical Center, located in south central Houston, is the largest medical center in the world. It is home to The University of Texas Health Science Center which trains medical students and residents and includes The University of Texas M.D. Anderson Cancer Center, a global leader of cancer research and treatment. The medical complex also hosts a private medical college, The Baylor College of Medicine.

The University of Texas medical system has additional branches in Dallas, San Antonio, Tyler, and Galveston. The South Texas Medical Center in San Antonio with nearly 27,000 employees has a $14.3 Billion economic impact on the state of Texas. In addition to these facilities, the Texas College of Osteopathic Medicine, the Texas A&M Health Science Center,, and Texas Tech University Health Sciences Center in Lubbock and El Paso provide the state with a total of nine centers of medical research.

Wealthiest places in Texas

	Southlake, Texas town, Texas	$176,427
	Barton Creek CDP, Texas	$110,504
	Westover Hills town, Texas $98,573
	Highland Park town, Texas	$97,008  
   Midland, Texas	$93,369 
	Hunters Creek Village city, Texas	$88,821
	Bunker Hill Village city, Texas	$86,434
	Hill Country Village city, Texas	$77,374
	Mustang town, Texas	$75,692
	West University Place city, Texas	$69,674
	Hilshire Village city, Texas	$66,620
	Olmos Park city, Texas	$65,697
      The Woodlands CDP, Texas $64,430
	University Park city, Texas	$63,414
	The Hills village, Texas	$61,363
	Southside Place city, Texas	$57,021
	West Lake Hills city, Texas	$55,651
	Onion Creek CDP, Texas	$54,758
	Tiki Island village, Texas	$54,611
	Parker city, Texas	$54,099
	Lakeshore Gardens-Hidden Acres CDP, Texas	$52,512
	Rollingwood city, Texas	$52,280
	Hedwig Village city, Texas	$52,153
	Lost Creek CDP, Texas	$52,147
	Heath city, Texas	$51,049
	Colleyville city, Texas	$50,418
	Shavano Park city, Texas	$47,705
	Sugar Land, Texas city, Texas	$47,597
	Bellaire city, Texas	$46,674
	Lakeway city, Texas	$45,765
	Ransom Canyon town, Texas	$45,675
	Alamo Heights city, Texas	$45,640

See also
Texas wine
:Category:Companies based in Texas
:Category:Economies by country
:Category:Economies by region
List of US state economies
Silicon Hills
Silicon Prairie
Texas rice production

References

External links
 The official State of Texas website
 BEA news release on 2005 gross state product
 State of Texas economic development
 Window on State Government, Susan Combs - Texas Comptroller
 Texas Lyceum Journal: "Harnessing the Lightning: Economic Growth Opportunities for Texas"